Charlie Lucian Reeve is a professor of psychology in the University of North Carolina at Charlotte's Ph.D. program in health psychology, where he is also an affiliate of the Cognitive Science Academy.

References

External links
Faculty page

Living people
Psychometricians
University of Minnesota alumni
Bowling Green State University alumni
21st-century American psychologists
University of North Carolina at Charlotte faculty
Year of birth missing (living people)